Bryobium, commonly known as urchin orchids or 藓兰属 (xian lan shu), is a genus of flowering plants in the family Orchidaceae. Orchids in this genus are epiphytic or lithophytic plants with large, fleshy pseudobulbs, each with up to three leathery leaves and small, often hairy flowers. These orchids are found from tropical Asia to northern Australia.

Description
Orchids in the genus are epiphytic or lithophytic herbs with thread-like roots and relatively large, fleshy pseudobulbs that are usually covered by papery bracts when young. Each pseudobulb has up to three flat, usually leathery leaves. The flowers are usually white, cream-coloured or pinkish, do not open widely and last for up to a few days. The dorsal sepal is free but the lateral sepals are fused to the base of the column. The petals are free from each other and usually smaller than the sepals. The labellum often has three lobes, in which case the side lobes are erect.

Taxonomy and naming
The genus Bryobium was first formally described in 1836 by John Lindley who published the description in A natural system of botany, or, A systematic view of the organization, natural affinities, and geographical distribution, of the whole vegetable kingdom. The name Bryobium is derived from the Ancient Greek words bryon meaning "moss" and bios meaning "life", an apparent reference to the habit of plants in this genus.

Species list
Bryobium species accepted by the Plants of the World Online as of February 2021:

Bryobium atrorubens 
Bryobium bicristatum 
Bryobium cordiferum 
Bryobium diaphanum 
Bryobium dischorense 
Bryobium eriaeoides 
Bryobium hyacinthoides 
Bryobium irukandjianum 
Bryobium kawengicum 
Bryobium lancifolium 
Bryobium lanuginosum 
Bryobium leavittii 
Bryobium montanum 
Bryobium moultonii 
Bryobium pudicum 
Bryobium puguahaanense 
Bryobium pullum 
Bryobium punctatum 
Bryobium queenslandicum 
Bryobium rendovaense 
Bryobium retusum 
Bryobium rhizophoreti 
Bryobium rubiferum 
Bryobium senile 
Bryobium subclausum 
Bryobium tridens 
Bryobium ventricosum

Distribution and habitat
Orchids in the genus Bryobium grow on the upper parts of rainforest trees or on rocks and boulders. They occur in China, the Indian subcontinent, Cambodia, Laos, Vietnam, Borneo, Java, the Lesser Sunda Islands, Peninsula Malaysia, Sulawesi, Sumatra, Christmas island, New Guinea, the Solomon Islands, Queensland, Australia and New Caledonia.

References

 
Podochileae genera